Remedy Flashboards is an extension of the Action Request System.  Flashboards allows users to define and view graphical representations of data held in the AR System.  The name is derived from the resemblance between the standard Flashboard display and the classic speedometer found on the dashboard of an automobile.

Related entries
Remedy Corp
BMC Software

External links
Flashboards page on www.bmc.com

Integrated development environments